Anantapur Sports Village is the home to Anantapur Sports Academy (ASA) which is considered to be one of the Sport for Development Programs in India, the Anantapur Sports Academy is a sport for development programme with a vision to utilise sport as a medium to create social change amongst rural children and youth in Anantapur, by aiding in their holistic development, breaking down gender barriers and enhancing livelihood opportunities. 

Currently, ASA runs programmes in the seven sporting disciplines of hockey, football, cricket, judo, softball, kho-kho and kabaddi, through 90 centres across Anantapur district engaging more than 10,840 children and youth, with 45% being girls. 
ASA operates the program through three avenues: Grassroot Program, Development Centres and Anantapur Sports Village (ASV).

Over the past two decades, Anantapur Sports Academy has been working continuously with like-minded organisations both at the grassroots level, including rural schools and respective district/state/national sport federations, as well as larger development initiatives like Pro Sport Development (India), Learning Curve Life Skills Foundation (India), Manipal Academy of Higher Education (India), La Liga Foundation and La Liga Women (Spain), One Million Hockey Legs (Netherlands) and Stick for India (Spain) to attain the vision of achieving social change using sport. 

Anantapur Sports Academy received Rashtriya Khel Protsahan Puaraskar, the highest award given by the Government of India in Sport For Development.

References

External links
Anantapur Sports Academy
Rural Development Trust (RDT) Official Website

 Anantapur, Andhra Pradesh
 Sports venues in Andhra Pradesh
 Buildings and structures in Anantapur district
2000 establishments in Andhra Pradesh
Sports venues completed in 2000